Leptodactylus latrans is a species of frog in the family Leptodactylidae.<ref>Lavilla, Langone, Caramaschi, Heyer & de Sá (2010). The identification of Rana ocellata Linnaeus, 1758. Nomenclatural impact on the species currently known as Leptodactylus ocellatus (Leptodactylidae) and Osteopilus brunneus (Gosse, 1851) (Hylidae). Zootaxa 2346: 1–16</ref> It is native to much of South America east of the Andes, and Trinidad and Tobago. It has many common names, including rana criolla, sapo-rana llanero, butter frog, and lesser foam frog.

Habitat and ecology
This is a common species in many parts of its range. It can be found in a variety of habitat types, including swamps, savannah, grasslands, and tropical forest ecosystems. It tolerates disturbed habitat and can be seen in gardens and urban areas. It breeds in temporary water bodies, such as ponds and floodplains, where it creates a foam nest for its eggs. In some cases, one parent, usually a female, guards the tadpoles and attacks potential predators.

Taxonomy
This taxon is considered to be a species complex, or a component of one, and taxonomic studies may distinguish several different species among its populations.

References

Further reading
 Bogart, J. P. (1974). A karyosystematic study of frogs in the genus Leptodactylus (Anura: Leptodactylidae). Copeia, (3), 728–737.
 Heyer, W. R. (1969). The adaptive ecology of the species groups of the Genus Leptodactylus (Amphibia, Leptodactylidae). Evolution, 23, 421–428.  
 Prado, C. P. de A., Uetanabaro, M., Haddad, C F. B. (2002). Description of a new reproductive mode in Leptodactylus (Anura, Leptodactylidae), with a review of the reproductive specialization towards terrestriality in the genus. Copeia'', 2002(4), 221–245.

latrans
Amphibians of Argentina
Amphibians of Bolivia
Amphibians of Brazil
Amphibians of Colombia
Amphibians of French Guiana
Amphibians of Guyana
Amphibians of Paraguay
Amphibians of Suriname
Amphibians of Trinidad and Tobago
Amphibians of Uruguay
Amphibians of Venezuela
Amphibians described in 1815
Taxonomy articles created by Polbot